Finkle is an unincorporated community in Clay County, in the U.S. state of Minnesota.

History
The community was named for Henry G. Finkle, a pioneer merchant.

References

Unincorporated communities in Clay County, Minnesota
Unincorporated communities in Minnesota